The 1921 Memorial Cup final was the third junior ice hockey championship of the Canadian Amateur Hockey Association. The George Richardson Memorial Trophy champions Stratford Midgets of the Ontario Hockey Association in Eastern Canada competed against the Abbott Cup champions Winnipeg Junior Falcons of the Manitoba Junior Hockey League in Western Canada. In a two-game, total goal series, held at the Arena Gardens in Toronto, Ontario, Winnipeg won their 1st Memorial Cup, defeating Stratford 11 goals to 9.

Scores
Game 1: Winnipeg 9-2 Stratford
Game 2: Stratford 7-2 Winnipeg

Winning roster
Scotty Comfort, Wally Fridfinnson, Sammy McCallum, Harold McMunn, Herb McMunn, Bill McPherson, Harry Neil, Dave Patrick, Art Somers, Frank Woodall.  Coach: Stan Bliss

References

External links
 Memorial Cup
 Canadian Hockey League

Mem
Ice hockey competitions in Toronto
Memorial Cup tournaments
1921 in Ontario
1920s in Toronto